The Restoration Council of Shan State (abbreviated RCSS) is a Shan political organisation in Shan State, Myanmar, founded in 1996 by Shan military leader Yawd Serk. Its armed wing, the Shan State Army – South (SSA–S), is signatory to the Nationwide Ceasefire Agreement with the government of Myanmar. Following the 1 February 2021 coup d'état, the Tatmadaw violated the ceasefire agreement by attacking the camps of the RCSS in Hsipaw Township.

References

Rebel groups in Myanmar
1996 establishments in Myanmar